Opine, also spelled O'Pine, is an unincorporated community in Covington County, Alabama, United States.

History
A post office operated under the name Opine from 1880 to 1891.

References

Unincorporated communities in Covington County, Alabama
Unincorporated communities in Alabama